Leigh-Pemberton or Leigh Pemberton may refer to:

Edward Leigh Pemberton (1823–1910), Conservative Member of Parliament for East Kent 1868–1885
James Leigh-Pemberton (born 1956), British banker and the Receiver-General for the Duchy of Cornwall
John Leigh-Pemberton (1911–1997), British artist and illustrator 
Robin Leigh-Pemberton, Baron Kingsdown (1927–2013), Governor of the Bank of England 1983–1993
Wykeham Leigh Pemberton (1833–1918), British army officer
Leigh-Pemberton House, house in Lincoln

See also
Thomas Pemberton Leigh, 1st Baron Kingsdown (1793–1867), English lawyer and Parliamentarian
Leigh (surname)
Pemberton (surname)

Compound surnames
Surnames of English origin